Vennacher Needle is a  mountain summit located in Kings Canyon National Park, in Fresno County of northern California, United States. The John Muir Trail, which passes one mile to the east of this mountain, provides one possible approach option. This mountain's name has been officially adopted by the United States Board on Geographic Names.

Climate
According to the Köppen climate classification system, Vennacher Needle is located in an alpine climate zone. Most weather fronts originate in the Pacific Ocean, and travel east toward the Sierra Nevada mountains. As fronts approach, they are forced upward by the peaks (orographic lift), causing them to drop their moisture in the form of rain or snowfall onto the range. Precipitation runoff from this mountain drains into tributaries of the Kings River.

Gallery

See also

 List of mountain peaks of California

References

External links

 Weather forecast: Vennacher Needle
 Summit photos

Mountains of Fresno County, California
Mountains of Kings Canyon National Park
North American 3000 m summits
Mountains of Northern California
Sierra Nevada (United States)